Muḥammad ibn Ibrāhīm al-Khazrajī (died 1258 AD ), also known as Ibn al-Khazrajī, was an Arab scholar and historian of the late Ayyubid period. A member of the Banū Khazraj and a native of Tlemcen, he taught ḥadīth in Alexandria. His work, which survives only in part, is based largely on that of Sibt ibn al-Jawzi. It is known by the title Taʾrīkh al-Dawlat al-Akrād wal-Atrāk ("History of the Kurdish and Turkish Empire"). It is arranged on a year-by-year basis and in each year a prominent jurist, poet or similar who died that year is celebrated with anecdotes. In its independent passages, it is a valuable source of Ayyubid history. It can be found in the manuscript Süleymaniye Kütüphanesi, MS Hekimoğlu Ali Paşa 695.

Editions
Muhammad ibn Ibrahim ibn Muhammad ibn Abi al-Fawaris Abd al-Aziz al-Ansari al-Khazraji, History of the Kurdish and Turkish Empire (1176–1200). Partial English translation from the Arabic with annotations by Fahmy Hafez. Ph.D. dissertation, University of Melbourne, 1985.

Notes

Bibliography

 
 
 

1258 deaths
Historians from the Ayyubid Sultanate
People from Tlemcen
13th-century Egyptian historians